Lovre is both a surname and a masculine given name. Notable people with the name include:

Surname
Goran Lovre (born 1982), Serbian footballer
Harold Lovre (1904–1972), American politician

Given name 
Lovre Čirjak (born 1991), Croatian footballer
Lovre Kalinić (born 1990), Croatian footballer
Lovre Vulin (born 1984), Croatian footballer

Masculine given names
Croatian masculine given names